is a train station in Gojō, Nara, Japan.

Lines
  JR-West
  Wakayama Line

Platforms and tracks

Surroundings
 Gojō city office
 Gojō police station
 Gojō Bus Center
 Eizanji Temple
 Yunomine Onsen
 Totsukawa Onsen
 Japan National Route 24

External links
 Official website 

Railway stations in Japan opened in 1898
Railway stations in Nara Prefecture